Saint Baglan was a 6th-century hermit who lived at Baglan in Wales.

Life
Baglan is said, on doubtful evidence, to have been a Breton prince, the son of Ithel Hael. He studied at Saint Illtud's monastic school at Llanilltud Fawr (Llantwit Major) and later travelled to the Vale of Neath as a missionary. He founded the church at Baglan and lived in a cell adjoining it.

Legend says that he was seen (either by Cadoc or Illtud) carrying fire in his robe without burning it so Illtud gave him a crozier and instructed him to build a church where he found a tree that bore three fruit. He found a tree that had a litter of pigs, a beehive, and a crow's nest; however, he preferred a spot lower down on the flat (either where St Catharine's church now stands or further out towards the bay). What was built by day was washed away by night (or disappeared at night, or was moved to the site by the tree at night). Finally, he gave in and built the church by the tree (presumably this site was rebuilt in the medieval period as St Baglan's church which burned down in 1954 and is now a sad ruin). The crozier apparently survived until the 17th century.

References

See also
Hermit
Monasticism
Brittany

6th-century Christian saints
Medieval Breton saints
Companions of Cadfan
People from Neath Port Talbot
Southwestern Brythonic saints
6th-century Welsh people
Welsh hermits

fr:Baglan
ru:Баглан (святой)